Bassens is the name of two communes in France:

 Bassens, Gironde, in the Gironde département
 Bassens, Savoie, in the Savoie département